Joseph Rider Farrington (October 15, 1897 – June 19, 1954) was an American newspaper editor and statesman who served in the United States Congress as delegate for the Territory of Hawai'i.

Education and military career
Farrington was born in Washington, D.C. to Wallace Rider Farrington, the future Territorial Governor of Hawai'i. While still an infant, he moved to Honolulu, Hawai'i with his parents where his father began work as an editor for the Honolulu Advertiser and later the Honolulu Star-Bulletin newspapers. Farrington attended Punahou School and, upon graduating, studied at the University of Wisconsin. He dropped out of college in June 1918 to enlist in the United States Army. He was commissioned a second lieutenant of field artillery in September 1918 and discharged the following December. He returned to the University of Wisconsin–Madison and graduated in 1919.

Newspaper career
As soon as he obtained his degree in Wisconsin, Farrington became a reporter on the staff of the Public Ledger in Philadelphia. He served three years as a member of its Washington bureau. He then returned to Honolulu to follow in his father's footsteps and entered the newspaper business. He became a reporter and then editor of the Honolulu Star-Bulletin. In 1939, Farrington succeeded his father to become president and general manager of the Honolulu Star-Bulletin, an office in which he served until his death.

Political career

Farrington began a part-time political career as secretary to the Hawai'i Legislative Commission in 1933. The following year he was elected to the Hawaii Territorial Senate, an office he served in through 1942. On January 3, 1943, Farrington was sworn in as a Republican delegate to Congress. He died in office in Washington, D.C. on June 19, 1954 of an apparent heart attack. His wife, Elizabeth P. Farrington, was elected to replace him in Congress. Farrington was buried in the Oahu Cemetery in Nuuanu Valley in Honolulu.

See also
 List of United States Congress members who died in office (1950–99)

References

External links 

Joseph Rider Farrington Congressional Papers collection
 
 
 

1897 births
1954 deaths
People from Washington, D.C.
University of Wisconsin–Madison alumni
Hawaii Republicans
Punahou School alumni
American newspaper publishers (people)
Members of the Hawaii Territorial Legislature
Delegates to the United States House of Representatives from the Territory of Hawaii
Republican Party members of the United States House of Representatives from Hawaii
Mass media in Honolulu
United States Army officers
United States Army personnel of World War I
20th-century American politicians
Burials at Oahu Cemetery